Real Deportivo Oriamendi was a Spanish football club based in Gijón, in the autonomous community of Asturias.

History
Founded in 1939 by the merger between Club Gijón and Oriamendi FC, RD Oriamendi started playing in Segunda División, but was relegated despite finishing fourth due to the league's new rules. After playing three seasons in the regional leagues, the club achieved promotion to Tercera División but subsequently merged with Club Hispania de Gijón, becoming Real Deportivo Oriamendi Hispania.

The new club changed its name to Real Deportivo Gijonés in 1945, and was Sporting de Gijón's farm team. It played four seasons in Tercera before folding in 1948.

Season to season

1 season in Segunda División
1 season in Tercera División

External links
ArefePedia team profile 
LaFutbolteca team profile 

Defunct football clubs in Asturias
Association football clubs established in 1939
Association football clubs disestablished in 1944
1939 establishments in Spain
1944 disestablishments in Spain
Sport in Gijón
Segunda División clubs